Reginald Allan Patterson (July 12, 1919 in Ottawa, Ontario - July 23, 2009 in Winnipeg, Manitoba) was a politician in the Canadian province of Manitoba.  He was a member of the Legislative Assembly of Manitoba from 1988 to 1990, representing the northeast Winnipeg riding of Radisson for the Manitoba Liberal Party.

The son of Harold Allan Patterson and Emma Lucille Denny, he was educated in Capreol, in Barrie, at the Ontario Agricultural College, the University of Western Ontario and the University of Minnesota.  He was a lecturer at the University of Western Ontario's School of Business Administration from 1967 to 1969, and a professor in the Faculty of Management at the University of Manitoba from 1974 to 1988.  Before teaching, Patterson was employed with the Dominion Rubber Company Limited Tire Division in Kitchener and Winnipeg and the T. Eaton Co. Limited in Winnipeg. He was also a National Executive Member of the Canadian Industrial Relations Association, and served as the Manitoba Liberal Party's Chief Financial Officer.

Patterson married Edith Charlotte Freed.

Patterson first ran for the Manitoba legislature in the provincial election of 1986, finishing third in Radisson with 1239 votes (incumbent New Democrat Gerard Lecuyer was re-elected with 4810 votes).  Two years later, in the provincial election of 1988, Patterson defeated Lecuyer by 1805 votes. This was a period of increased support for the Liberals, who increased their parliamentary representation from one to twenty in the 1988 election.

This rise in Liberal support proved to be transient, and Patterson was defeated in the provincial election of 1990, finishing in third place with 1925 votes.  New Democrat Marianne Cerilli recaptured the riding for her party with 4055 votes.  Patterson did not seek a return to political life after this time.

Patterson later served as a board member on the Winnipeg Public Library.

He died in the St. Boniface Hospital at the age of 90.

Election results

References

1919 births
2009 deaths
Politicians from Ottawa
Manitoba Liberal Party MLAs
University of Minnesota alumni
University of Western Ontario alumni
Academic staff of the University of Western Ontario
Academic staff of the University of Manitoba
Chief financial officers